21C Korea College Students' Union(21세기 한국대학생연합) or Handaeryeon(한대련) is a leftist student organization in South Korea. It is the largest student organization in South Korea.

Delegate

See also 
Education in South Korea
Politics of South Korea
Hanchongryun

References

External links 
Handaeryeon website

Politics of South Korea
Student organizations in South Korea